What Happens Next is the sixteenth studio album by guitarist Joe Satriani, released on January 12, 2018, through Sony Music.

Background
On What Happens Next, Satriani consciously went in a more simplistic direction than on his previous album, Shockwave Supernova. As opposed to an alien alter ego, this time he wrote songs "about a human being, two feet on the ground, heart pumping, with emotions, dreams, and hopes. That seemed to be the direction I really was yearning for". He referred to it as an 'internal artistic rebirth' and collaborated with Red Hot Chili Peppers drummer Chad Smith, Deep Purple bassist Glenn Hughes, and producer Mike Fraser.

Track listing
All tracks are written by Joe Satriani.

Personnel
 Joe Satriani – guitar, keyboards, programming, additional recording
 Glenn Hughes – bass
 Chad Smith – drums

Additional personnel
 Eric Caudieux - sound designer, digital editing
 Mike Fraser - producing, recording, engineering, mixing
 Adam Ayan - mastering
 Geoff Neal - Sunset Sound assistant engineering
 Jaimeson Durr - The Foot Locker assistant engineering
 Hayden Watson - assistant engineering, mixing
 Zach Blackstone - assistant engineering, mixing
 Joseph Cultice - photography
 Todd Gallopo - art direction, design
 TJ River - design

Charts

References

External links
 What Happens Next at satriani.com

Joe Satriani albums
2018 albums
Sony Music albums
Legacy Recordings albums